Sedov may refer to:

 STS Sedov, a sail training ship
 Sedov (surname)
 Georgiy Sedov (icebreaker)
 2785 Sedov, an asteroid
 Cape Sedov, an Antarctic ice cape